Josée Néron is a Canadian politician, who was elected mayor of Saguenay, Quebec in the 2017 municipal election. She is the second mayor, and the first female mayor, of the city since the municipal amalgamation in 2002.

Prior to her election as mayor, Néron served on Saguenay City Council.

References

Mayors of Saguenay, Quebec
French Quebecers
Women mayors of places in Quebec
Living people
21st-century Canadian women politicians
Year of birth missing (living people)